Antonio Fernández may refer to:

 Antonio M. Fernández (1902–1956), United States Representative from New Mexico
 Antonio Fernández (archer) (born 1991), Spanish sport archer
 Antonio Fernández (athlete) (born 1948), Spanish athlete,  middle-distance runner
 Antonio Deinde Fernandez (1929–2015), Nigerian businessman and diplomat
 Antonio Fernández Arias (died 1684), Spanish painter
 Antonio Fernández Bordas (1870–1950), Spanish violinist and musical teacher
 Antonio Fernández Santillana (1876–1909), early pioneer in aviation
 Antonio Fernandez (Gang), former head of Latin Kings
 Antonio Fernández (footballer), Spanish football player and manager
 Antonio Fernández (football manager) (born 1970), Spanish football manager
 Antonio César Fernández (1946–2019), Spanish missionary

See also
 António Fernandes (disambiguation)